Splendrillia roseacincta is a species of sea snail, a marine gastropod mollusk in the family Drilliidae.

Description
The length of the shell attains 17 mm, the diameter 6 mm.

Distribution
This marine species is endemic to New Zealand and occurs off the Chatham Islands.

References

 Dell, Richard Kenneth. The archibenthal mollusca of New Zealand. Dominion Museum, 1956.
 Powell, A.W.B. 1979: New Zealand Mollusca: Marine, Land and Freshwater Shells, Collins, Auckland

External links
 
  Tucker, J.K. 2004 Catalog of recent and fossil turrids (Mollusca: Gastropoda). Zootaxa 682:1–1295.

roseacincta
Gastropods of New Zealand
Gastropods described in 1956